Thomas J. O'Brien Lock & Dam is a stop lock in the Hegewisch neighborhood on the South Side of Chicago at the confluence of the Grand Calumet River and Little Calumet River, which form the Calumet River. It is a component of the Chicago Area Waterway System (CAWS), which is, itself, a part of the Illinois Waterway, which links the Mississippi River and the Great Lakes.

The Lock & Dam is named for Thomas J. O’Brien, who was a U.S. Representative for the 6th District of Illinois from 1933 to 1938 and again from 1943 to 1964.

Overview
The lock contains a pair of sector gates at either end, which were chosen as they both reduce the cost of engineering and are more conducive to operations in a waterway which can reverse direction. The dam measures  and includes 4 vertical sluice gates.

The lock and dam are used to maintain a 9-foot navigation channel, and for flood control purposes, primarily to limit diversion from the lake during normal periods, and mitigation of backflows into Lake Michigan during large storm events which reverse the direction of the river.

History
Predating the lock and dam was the Blue Island Lock, constructed at the eastern end of the Cal-Sag Channel in 1922. However, it would not be until 1946 when Congress would authorize funding for the improvements to the Cal-Sag Channel and a new lock. The location of the new lock and dam upstream from the old controlling works at Blue Island was chosen to improve the ability to control backflow events into the lake during heavy storms from the heavily polluted Grand Calumet River and Little Calumet River. Construction began in 1957, and were completed in 1960, though the lock portion was not put into operation until July 1, 1965, when the Blue Island Lock was finally decommissioned.

See also
 Illinois Waterway Lock and dams
 Chicago Harbor Lock, located on the Chicago River

References

External links

Illinois waterways
Dams completed in 1960
1960 establishments in Illinois
Dams in Illinois
Locks of Illinois